Joan Bogle Hickson, OBE (5 August 1906 – 17 October 1998) was an English actress of theatre, film and television. She was known for her role as Agatha Christie's Miss Marple in the television series Miss Marple. She also narrated a number of Miss Marple stories on audiobooks.

Biography
Born in Kingsthorpe, Northampton, Hickson was a daughter of Edith Mary (née Bogle) and Alfred Harold Hickson, a shoe manufacturer. After boarding at Oldfield School in Swanage, Dorset, she went on to train at RADA in London. She made her stage debut in 1927, then worked for several years throughout the United Kingdom, achieving success playing comedic, often eccentric characters in the West End of London. She played the role of the cockney maid Ida in the original production of See How They Run at the Q Theatre in 1944, and then at the Comedy Theatre in January 1945.

She made her first film appearance in 1934. The numerous supporting roles she played during her career included several in Carry On films, notably Sister in Carry On Nurse and Mrs May in Carry On Constable.

In the 1940s she appeared on stage in Appointment with Death, a play by Agatha Christie, who wrote in a note to her, "I hope one day you will play my dear Miss Marple." 

In 1961 Hickson played the housekeeper in the film Murder, She Said, based on Agatha Christie's novel 4.50 From Paddington and starring Margaret Rutherford as Miss Marple. 
From 1963 to 1966 Hickson played Mrs Peace, housekeeper to the Reverend Stephen Young, played by Donald Sinden, in the highly rated TV series Our Man at St Mark's. From 1970 to 1971 she played Mrs Pugsley in Bachelor Father. She also played Mrs Chambers in Whatever Happened to the Likely Lads?. In 1986 she played the part of Mrs Trellis in the film Clockwise.

Her stage career included roles in Noël Coward's Blithe Spirit, the musical The Card (1975), adapted by Tony Hatch and Jackie Trent from the novel by Arnold Bennett; and Alan Ayckbourn's Bedroom Farce, for which she won a 1979 Tony Award for Best Featured Actress in a Play. In 1980 she appeared as Mrs Rivington in Why Didn't They Ask Evans?, yet another production based on a novel by Agatha Christie.

The BBC began filming the works of Agatha Christie in the mid-1980s, and set out to remain faithful to the plotlines and locales of Christie's stories, and to represent Miss Marple as written. Hickson played the role of Miss Marple in all 12 adaptations, which were produced from 1984 to 1992; she received two BAFTA nominations for Best TV Actress, in 1987 and 1988. When the OBE was bestowed on Hickson in June 1987 Queen Elizabeth II was reported to have said, "You play the part just as one envisages it." When Hickson retired from the role, believing that she should stop while the programme was still at the peak of its popularity, she stated that she had no intention of retiring from acting altogether.

Wivenhoe

From 1958, Hickson lived in Rose Lane, Wivenhoe, along the River Colne  from London in Essex, until her death in 1998. A plaque now marks the house where she lived for 40 years.

Marriage
Hickson married Dr Eric Norman Butler (born 2 September 1902 in Westbury, Wiltshire), a physician, at Hampstead Parish Church, Hampstead, Northwest London, on 29 October 1932. They had two children. Her husband died in Colchester, Essex, in June 1967.

Death
Hickson died in Colchester General Hospital from a stroke, aged 92. She is interred under her married name, Joan Bogle Butler, at Sidbury Cemetery in Devon.

The Miss Marple series (BBC)
Series 1
The Body in the Library (1984)
The Moving Finger (1985)
A Murder Is Announced (1985)
A Pocket Full of Rye (1985)

Series 2
The Murder at the Vicarage (1986) – BAFTA nomination
Sleeping Murder (1987)
At Bertram's Hotel (1987)
Nemesis (1987) – BAFTA nomination

Stand-alone feature length episodes
4.50 from Paddington (1987)
A Caribbean Mystery (1989)
They Do It With Mirrors (1991)
The Mirror Crack'd from Side to Side (1992)

Partial filmography

Partial television credits

References

External links

Performances by Joan Hickson in the Archive of the University of Bristol
Joan Hickson OBE (1906–1998) at The Wivenhoe Encyclopedia

1906 births
1998 deaths
Audiobook narrators
English film actresses
English stage actresses
English television actresses
Officers of the Order of the British Empire
Actors from Northamptonshire
Tony Award winners
20th-century English actresses
People from West Northamptonshire District
Alumni of RADA